Hail Mary of Gold is a Roman Catholic Marian prayer attributed to Saint Gertrude the Great.
 
According to Saint Gertrude, the Virgin Mary stated that: "At the hour when the soul which has thus greeted me quits the body, I will appear to them in such splendid beauty that they will taste, to their great consolation, something of the joys of Paradise".

Text
Hail, Mary, White Lily of the Glorious and Always-serene Trinity.
Hail, Brilliant Rose of the Garden of Heavenly Delights;
O you, by whom God wanted to be born, and by whose milk the King of Heaven wanted to be nourished!
Nourish our souls with effusions of divine grace.
Amen!

References
 Queen of Heaven  
 Catholic Devotions

See also
 Roman Catholic Mariology
 The Glories of Mary

Catholic Mariology
Marian devotions
Roman Catholic prayers